Studia Celtica is an annual journal published in Wales containing scholarly articles on linguistic topics, mainly in English but with some Welsh and German; it also contains book reviews and obituaries. The journal is published by the University of Wales Press on behalf of the University of Wales Board of Celtic Studies. Since 1993 it has also covered literary, historical, and archaeological topics pertaining to Celtic studies. From 1922 to 1992 it was published under the title Bulletin of the Board of Celtic Studies. "The journal was an immediate success, attracting contributions from some of the leading specialists."

Later issues are available electronically from the IngentaConnect subscription service.

References

External links

Annual journals
Celtic studies journals
History journals
Linguistics journals
Multilingual journals
Publications established in 1922
Mass media in Cardiff